Huyuan is a village under the administration of Fuyang City, Zhejiang, located to the south of Fuyang.

See also
List of township-level divisions of Zhejiang

References

Geography of Hangzhou
Townships of Zhejiang